John Thomas Forde (14 March 1931 – 3 January 2012), known as Tommy Forde, was a Northern Irish professional footballer who played as a centre half for Distillery, Wolverhampton Wanderers, Glenavon and Ards. Forde also earned four caps at international level for Northern Ireland between 1958 and 1960. 

Forde was the elder brother of Hugh Forde. Tommy Forde died in Adelaide on 3 January 2012, at the age of 80.

References

External links
Profile at NIFG

1931 births
2012 deaths
Association footballers from Northern Ireland
Northern Ireland international footballers
Lisburn Distillery F.C. players
Wolverhampton Wanderers F.C. players
Glenavon F.C. players
Ards F.C. players
Association football central defenders